Dik or DIK may refer to:

People

Surname
 Carla Dik-Faber (born 1971), Dutch art historian and politician
 Natalia Dik (born 1961), Russian painter
 Simon C. Dik (1940–1995), Dutch linguist
 Wim Dik (born 1939), former head of Royal PTT Nederland NV

Given name
 Dirk Bouwmeester or Dik Bouwmeester (born 1967), Dutch experimental physicist 
 Dik Browne (1917–1989), American cartoonist
 Dik Cadbury, English multi-instrumentalist
 Dik Davis (also called Dik Davies), drummer
 Dick Esser or Dik Esser (1918–1979), Dutch field hockey player (usually misspelled "Dick")
 Dik Evans (born 1957), British-Irish rock guitarist

Fictional characters
 Dik Trom, protagonist boy of a Dutch children's book series 
 Dikkie Dik, protagonist cat of a Dutch children's book series

Other uses
 Dickinson Theodore Roosevelt Regional Airport (IATA code), US

See also
 Richard, a given name sometimes shortened to Dik
 Diederik, a given name sometimes shortened to Dik
 Dik-dik, a small antelope
 Dik Dik, an Italian beat-pop-rock band
 Dick (disambiguation)